Fundamental law(s) may refer to:

 Organic law, in particular,
 Constitution, in particular,
 The Russian Constitution of 1906
 The German Grundgesetz (more commonly translated as "Basic Law")
 The four individual laws that together make up the Constitution of Sweden
 The Fundamental Laws of England
 The Fundamental Law of Vatican City State
 The Fundamental Law of Hungary
 The Basic Laws of a country which does not use the term "constitution", or has an uncodified constitution
 The fundamental physical laws of the universe
 In Abrahmic religions, The Ten Commandments